Uncle Fester is a member of the fictional Addams Family. He was played by Jackie Coogan in the television series The Addams Family (1964), by Christopher Lloyd in the feature films The Addams Family (1991) and Addams Family Values (1993), by Patrick Thomas in the direct-to-video film Addams Family Reunion (1998), by Michael Roberds in the television series The New Addams Family (1998–1999), and by Fred Armisen in the streaming television series Wednesday (2022). In the Broadway musical, the part was originated by Kevin Chamberlin.

Character
Uncle Fester is a completely hairless, hunched, and barrel-shaped man with dark, sunken eyes and often a deranged smile. He always wears a heavy, full-length fur coat. Fester was derived from a character drawn by cartoonist Charles Addams, although these were single-page cartoons, with no stories or character names. Nevertheless, the character is recognizable in a number of cartoons, both by his appearance (bald, stooping, sunken eyes) and behavior (e.g. turning the shower into a special "scalding" setting, feeding his garden plants blood plasma, and releasing an eagle on the neighbor's homing pigeons). While he is occasionally seen with the rest of the family, particularly on anthology covers, he is also seen on his own more often than the others. He is sometimes indicated to live in a small shack surrounded by a wrought-iron fence.

Fester has a strange ability to generate electricity (in the film The Addams Family, he loses his memory and regains it after being struck by lightning, leading to this power, though in other adaptations it is never stated where he got his power from). He would often demonstrate this by putting a light bulb in his mouth, which would illuminate, accompanied by a loud, crackling noise. He claims to possess 110 volts of power in one episode of the sitcom, while in another episode he demonstrated his "magnetic" quality by levitating a metal paperweight up to his hand. In the Netflix series “Wednesday”, he can shoot lightning directly from his hands and uses it to revive a near-dead Thing. This ability is also believed to give him resistance to lightning; when struck directly on the head by a fired cannonball, he appears only mildly dazed, while the cannonball bounces off his head.

Uncle Fester at times has severe migraines but appears to enjoy them. Fester relieves his migraines by placing his head in a large screw press and tightening it to levels that normal people would not be able to withstand. At times, Fester uses the screw press on his head simply for enjoyment.

Despite Uncle Fester's menacing look and bizarre behavior, he is gentle and caring to everyone. He shows great respect to Gomez and Morticia. He has always exhibited love and great care to his niece and nephews, despite their frequent naughtiness.

In the original sitcom of the 1960s, Fester is said to be Morticia's maternal uncle (his name rhymes with Morticia's mother Hester's), but from the 1970s onward, he is Gomez's brother; they are very close, though he admits to sometimes “despising” Gomez and is sometimes jealous of his relationship with Morticia, often trying to find love to chaotic consequences. In all adaptations, he is either uncle or great-uncle to Wednesday and Pugsley. He is known as "Tío Fétido" in Spain, "Tío Lucas" in Spanish-speaking countries, and "Fétide" in France. In Brazil, he has two names: "Tio Chico" (original series and cartoon) and "Tio Fester" (Broadway musical and movies).

In the 2022 Netflix series Wednesday, Fester still possesses his electric powers and a great affection for his niece, but is portrayed as more roguish and bloodthirsty, appearing at Nevermore Academy looking for a place to hide out from the law and saying he used to keep Gomez on his toes by dropping "from the ceiling, with a dagger clutched between my teeth".

Live action TV series
In the 1960s television series, Fester (portrayed by Jackie Coogan) is an uncle to Morticia Addams. In one episode, he became perplexed when asked his last name, suggesting he has somehow forgotten it. In several episodes, Fester refers to the Addams lineage as if it were his own, possibly implying some degree of intertwined consanguinity in both their family lines, but the flashbacks in the episodes "Morticia's Romance, Parts 1 and 2," clearly establish him as Morticia's uncle, brother of her mother, Hester Frump, a.k.a. Granny Frump (portrayed by Margaret Hamilton), whose maiden name was similarly unrevealed (indicating at a third family, similar to the Addamses and the Frumps). In various episodes, he was a partner in typical sitcom schemes with Gomez, Morticia, or Grandmama Addams, indicating no real preference for any family member over others.

Fester's known ancestry dates back to his Great-Grandfather Blob (not to be confused with Gomez's Cousin Blob, a two-headed ghost), who received the gift of a sacred ruby after he had pried it from the head of a Hindu (to whom it was giving a terrible headache). The ruby remained in the family until Fester unthinkingly used his slingshot to hurl it at a yowling stray cat. "Well, it was the only rock in the house!" he said in his defense.

Per the 1960s sitcom, little is known of Fester's childhood, save that his father (Morticia's maternal grandfather) was an excruciatingly strict man who severely disciplined him, paddling him even when he was good and paying him to stay out of public (Fester considered this to be experienced in "public relations"). He refused to allow Fester to even touch a battleaxe (a treasured toy among people with the Addams's macabre tastes) until he was eight. As an adult, Fester defended his father's strictness, pointing to his own character as proof of its effectiveness: "I didn't become what I am by accident! I had an upbringing like no other!" Sometime prior to Morticia's marriage to Gomez, Fester worked as a newspaper columnist, writing advice for the lovelorn, but left that job because people kept suing him.

Fester has also offered contradictory information about his educational background. In the sitcom's first episode, he notes that he never went to school ("And look how [well] I turned out!"), but he later claims to have failed recess three times. As an adult, Fester took correspondence courses in various subjects, and his educational endeavors occasionally formed an episode's main plot. It may be from one such course that he obtained his fraternity paddle, which he once threatened to use on Wednesday in imitation of his father's punishment style; however, like many an uncle, Fester proved to have more bark than bite in dealing with the children. When he suspects someone of maligning, cheating, or otherwise mistreating anyone in the family, Fester is ever ready with his blunderbuss "Genevieve", eager to "shoot 'em in the back!" However, he is far less eager in meeting a malefactor in a face-to-face duel; he was briefly enthusiastic about a pistol duel with an enemy until he asked, somewhat timidly, "Does he get one too?...Loaded?"

Another prized possession was his cannon, "Old Reliable", which he normally kept in his bedroom. Fester maintained a treehouse in the Addams yard and frequently retreated to his closet to think. After receiving the gift of a motorcycle in the episode "The Addams Family Meets a Beatnik", Fester often drove it through the living room, inevitably crashing in the conservatory (several episodes used identical recycled footage of this scenario). Fester also collects three-dollar bills.

The 1998 live-action series continues the tradition of having Fester (portrayed by Canadian actor Michael Roberds) as Gomez's biological brother, yet between this version and the 1960s series, this is the only visible difference. In furtherance on the original series running gag of Uncle Fester being able to store electricity, one episode has Uncle Fester nearly abducted by aliens so as to be used to power their spaceship; the Aliens leave Uncle Fester behind-but only after "cloning" him for their spaceship journey home.

In the Netflix show Wednesday, Uncle Fester is played by Fred Armisen. He helped Wednesday on solving her mysteries of the town of Jericho and Nevermore Academy by revealing to Wednesday that the mystery monster she encountered was a Hyde. Because of his hobby with electricity, he can now project lightning from his own hands. It was also mentioned that Uncle Fester didn't attend Nevermore, but snuck in to visit Gomez on occasion. Wedneday had to use Eugene Otinger's bee house for Uncle Fester to hide out in after he robbed a bank and is advised by her not to eat any of Eugene's bees.

Animated TV series
In the first animated series by Hanna-Barbera, Jackie Coogan reprised his role as Fester. He also voiced that same character on an episode of The New Scooby-Doo Movies.

In the second animated series by Hanna-Barbera, Fester was voiced by Rip Taylor. In this series, Fester is perhaps the most loving of self-inflicted injury. He would allow other members (usually Lurch) to harm him any way they can, but his greatest fondness was blowing himself up. As a running gag, Fester would never believe Granny's predictions until she predicts something that causes him great harm (or in his case, great joy). Fester also is very fond of the Addamses' next-door neighbor, Norman Normanmayer, a boring person controlling an underwear empire who hates Fester (and the whole Addams family) for his strangeness (on an occasion, Fester comes on a visit through the sewer pipes). Fester seems quite oblivious of the fact that Norman hates him and, possibly due to the Addams family nature, thinks that all the angry and aggressive outbreaks are a sign of affection. This Fester also introduces himself, through his self-made comic books, as "Festerman", a gothic hero with a weakness to chimneys, who gives his flying cape to enemies upon request—so as to fall and would bring villains to their knees...simply by enjoying all the harm they would give him to the point of wearing them out. During this series, he is given a musical-type episode about the "Fester Way", his own, strange way of life.

Films
In the 1991 film The Addams Family, Fester (played by Christopher Lloyd) is the long-lost brother of Gomez Addams. He was believed to have been lost in the Bermuda Triangle for 25 years. A loan shark named Abigail Craven (portrayed by Elizabeth Wilson) conspires to steal the Addams fortune using her son Gordon, who displays an eerie resemblance to the missing Fester. On the night that the Addamses hold an annual séance to contact Fester's spirit, Gordon shows up at their door, posing as Fester.  Although he is baffled and horrified by the Addamses at first, Gordon begins to take a liking to the family and their strange ways, feeling more at home with them.  This inner-conflict is one of the main aspects of the movie; the growing comfort he feels with the Addamses, verses his mother emotional manipulations.  In the end, he disobeys his mother and helps Gomez and his family get their house back. It is later discovered that, all-along, Gordon is actually Fester; his disappearance actually had left him suffering from amnesia, and Abigail found him and, in-light of his inhuman strength, convinced him that he was her son (and henchman). Fester eventually regains his memories after a lightning strike to the head, which also gives him the ability to conduct electricity. In Gomez's childhood home movies, Fester is shown to be hairless as a child (although, as Gordon, he first appears with brown, curly hair, and is later shown shaving his head). 

Fester, again played by Lloyd, appears in the 1993 sequel Addams Family Values. He becomes attracted to Debbie Jellinsky (portrayed by Joan Cusack), whom Gomez and Morticia have hired as a nanny to care for their children. Debbie marries Fester with the intent of killing him and inheriting his share of the Addams fortune, but he survives each attempt on his life. After she inadvertently electrocutes herself while trying to kill the entire family, Fester mourns her death. Some time later, Fester becomes attracted to Dementia (portrayed by Carol Hankins), a nanny whom Cousin Itt and his wife, Margaret, have hired to look after their baby.

Fester again appears in the direct-to-video film Addams Family Reunion, portrayed by Patrick Thomas. He is portrayed as a mad scientist reminiscent of old Grade-B horror films. He creates a dog named "Butcher" as a birthday present for Pugsley—a dog that mutates into a hair-devouring brute whenever someone says "good boy." In the end, Butcher attacks Cousin Itt—who is, understandably, quite nervous around him.

Fester is voiced by Nick Kroll in 2019 computer-animated adaptation of The Addams Family and its sequel where he is given a Gilbert Gottfried-esque voice.

Musical
In the musical, Uncle Fester was played by Kevin Chamberlin in the original broadway cast. Chamberlin received a Tony nomination for the role. He was later played by Brad Oscar, Blake Hammond, Russell Dykstra, and Shaun Rice. This incarnation of Fester serves as the musical's narrator and is in love with the moon. The subject of love is apparently his "specialty", and he is able to play the ukulele when he sings a love song to the moon. He also seems to communicate with the ancestors throughout the show more than the other characters.

Video games
Uncle Fester has appeared in several Addams Family video games as a playable character. He is the protagonist of Fester's Quest, a NES game, and the main playable character in the Addams Family Values SNES game. He is also the main character in "Electrifying" arcade machine, where simulated "electrical shocks" are passed through the player as they hold on to two handles.

Relationships

Family tree

References

Comics characters introduced in 1938
The Addams Family characters
Male characters in comics
Male characters in film
Male characters in television
Fictional characters with electric or magnetic abilities